Erwin Ramsdell Goodenough (24 October 1893 – 20 March 1965) was a scholar in the history of religion. He is specifically noted for his study of the influence of Greek culture on Judaism, what some call Hellenistic Judaism.

Goodenough was born in Brooklyn, the son of Mary Belle (Ramsdell) and Ward Hunt Goodenough. He studied at Hamilton College, Drew Theological Seminary, and then received a bachelor's degree in theology from Garrett Biblical Institute in 1917.  He went on to Harvard University for three years, then three more years at Oxford University, where he received the D.Phil. degree in 1923.

He then began teaching at Yale University in 1923, where he taught until he retired in 1962. He went on to Brandeis University, then was given an office in the Widener Library at Harvard. He received honorary degrees from Yale, Hebrew Union College, and the University of Uppsala.

He edited the Journal of Biblical Literature from 1934–1942.

His papers are archived at Yale.  After his death, he was honored by a volume of studies in his honor, Religions in Antiquity: Essays in Memory of Erwin Ramsdell Goodenough, edited by Jacob Neusner, published by E.J. Brill in 1968 (reprinted by Wipf and Stock in 2004).

His first marriage, to Helen Miriam (Lewis), produced two noted professors: University of Pennsylvania anthropologist Ward Goodenough (1919–2013) and University of Texas solid-state physicist John B. Goodenough (born 1922, who in 2019 became the oldest ever Nobel laureate), and his second marriage, to Evelyn (Pitcher), produced two more: Ursula Goodenough and Daniel Goodenough.

Publications
1923. The Theology of Justin Martyr.
1929. The Jurisprudence of the Jewish Courts in Egypt.
1930, The Church in the Roman Empire
1935. The Mystic Gospel of Hellenistic Judaism.
1937, Religious Tradition and Myth
1938. The Politics of Philo Judaeus, with a General Bibliography of Philo.
1940. An Introduction to Philo Judaeus.
1953-1968. Jewish Symbols in the Greco-Roman Period. twelve volumes of text and illustrations, plus a thirteenth of indexes, maps and corrigenda over many years. An abridged version with the same title was edited by Jacob Neusner (Princeton 1988). 
1955. Toward a Mature Faith.
1968. "Religions in Antiquity: Essays in Memory of Erwin Ramsdell Goodenough" Ed. by Jacob Neusner (1968).

Further reading
Smith, Morton. 1965. Memorial minute [obituary].  Numen 12.3:233-235.

References

External links 

 Erwin Ramsdell Goodenough (MS 723). Manuscripts and Archives, Yale University Library. 

Judaic studies
1893 births
1965 deaths
Hamilton College (New York) alumni
Harvard University alumni
Yale University faculty
Brandeis University faculty